Behlol Pur may refer to:

 Behlol Pur, Gujrat
 Behlol Pur, Okara